In quantum mechanics, a quantum speed limit (QSL) is a limitation on the minimum time for a quantum system to evolve between two distinguishable states. QSL are closely related to time-energy uncertainty relations. In 1945, Leonid Mandelstam and Igor Tamm derived a time-energy uncertainty relation that bounds the speed of evolution in terms of the energy dispersion. Over half a century later, Norman Margolus and Lev Levitin showed that the speed of evolution cannot exceed the mean energy, a result known as the Margolus–Levitin theorem. Realistic physical systems in contact with an environment are known as open quantum systems and their evolution is also subject to QSL. Quite remarkably it was shown that environmental effects, such as non-Markovian dynamics can speed up quantum processes, which was verified in a cavity QED experiment.

QSL have been used to explore the limits of computation and complexity. In 2017, QSLs were studied in a quantum oscillator at high temperature.  In 2018, it was shown that QSL are not restricted to the quantum domain and that similar bounds hold in classical systems.  In 2021, both the Mandelstam-Tamm and the Margolus-Levitin QSL bounds were concurrently tested in a single experiment which indicated there are "two different regimes: one where the Mandelstam-Tamm limit constrains the evolution at all times, and a second where a crossover to the Margolus-Levitin limit occurs at longer times."

References 

Quantum mechanics
Mathematical physics